The 2011 Extremaduran regional election was held on Sunday, 22 May 2011, to elect the 8th Assembly of the autonomous community of Extremadura. All 65 seats in the Assembly were up for election. The election was held simultaneously with regional elections in twelve other autonomous communities and local elections all throughout Spain.

For the first time since the first democratic election in 1983 in the region, the People's Party (PP) was able to win a regional election, obtaining its best historical result, with 46.1% of the share and 32 seats. The Spanish Socialist Workers' Party (PSOE), which had formed the government of the Extremaduran region since 1983, achieving an absolute majority of seats at every election except in 1995, was ousted from power in the worst result obtained by the party until that time.

However, as the PP stood one seat short of an overall majority, the possibility arose of PSOE pact with United Left (IU), which had re-entered the Assembly after a four-year absence, in order to maintain the regional government. However, IU declined to support outgoing Socialist Guillermo Fernández Vara after a 24-year PSOE rule over the region, opting to abstain in the investiture voting and allowing the most-voted candidate to be elected. As a result of the PP having more seats than the PSOE, party candidate José Antonio Monago became the first not-Socialist democratically elected President of the region.

Overview

Electoral system
The Assembly of Extremadura was the devolved, unicameral legislature of the autonomous community of Extremadura, having legislative power in regional matters as defined by the Spanish Constitution and the Extremaduran Statute of Autonomy, as well as the ability to vote confidence in or withdraw it from a regional president.

Voting for the Assembly was on the basis of universal suffrage, which comprised all nationals over 18 years of age, registered in Extremadura and in full enjoyment of their political rights. Amendments to the electoral law in 2011 required for Extremadurans abroad to apply for voting before being permitted to vote, a system known as "begged" or expat vote. The 65 members of the Assembly of Extremadura were elected using the D'Hondt method and a closed list proportional representation, with an electoral threshold of five percent of valid votes—which included blank ballots—being applied in each constituency. Alternatively, parties failing to reach the threshold in one of the constituencies were also entitled to enter the seat distribution as long as they ran candidates in both districts and reached five percent regionally. Seats were allocated to constituencies, corresponding to the provinces of Badajoz and Cáceres, with each being allocated an initial minimum of 20 seats and the remaining 25 being distributed in proportion to their populations.

The electoral law provided that parties, federations, coalitions and groupings of electors were allowed to present lists of candidates. However, groupings of electors were required to secure the signature of at least 2 percent of the electors registered in the constituency for which they sought election. Electors were barred from signing for more than one list of candidates. Concurrently, parties and federations intending to enter in coalition to take part jointly at an election were required to inform the relevant Electoral Commission within ten days of the election being called.

Election date
After legal amendments earlier in 2011, fixed-term mandates were abolished, instead allowing the term of the Assembly of Extremadura to expire after an early dissolution. The election decree was required to be issued no later than the twenty-fifth day prior to the date of expiry of parliament and published on the following day in the Official Journal of Extremadura (DOE), with election day taking place on the fifty-fourth day from publication. The previous election was held on 27 May 2007, which meant that the legislature's term would have expired on 27 May 2011. The election decree was required to be published in the DOE no later than 3 May 2011, with the election taking place on the fifty-fourth day from publication, setting the latest possible election date for the Assembly on Sunday, 26 June 2011.

The president had the prerogative to dissolve the Assembly of Extremadura and call a snap election, provided that no motion of no confidence was in process and that dissolution did not occur before one year had elapsed since the previous one. In the event of an investiture process failing to elect a regional president within a two-month period from the first ballot, the Assembly was to be automatically dissolved and a fresh election called.

Opinion polls
The table below lists voting intention estimates in reverse chronological order, showing the most recent first and using the dates when the survey fieldwork was done, as opposed to the date of publication. Where the fieldwork dates are unknown, the date of publication is given instead. The highest percentage figure in each polling survey is displayed with its background shaded in the leading party's colour. If a tie ensues, this is applied to the figures with the highest percentages. The "Lead" column on the right shows the percentage-point difference between the parties with the highest percentages in a poll. When available, seat projections determined by the polling organisations are displayed below (or in place of) the percentages in a smaller font; 33 seats were required for an absolute majority in the Assembly of Extremadura.

Results

Overall

Distribution by constituency

Aftermath

Government formation

2014 motion of no confidence

References
Opinion poll sources

Other

2011 in Extremadura
Extremadura
Regional elections in Extremadura
May 2011 events in Europe